Mahale may refer to:

Mahalé, an island in Ivory Coast
Mahale Chiniha, Iran
Mahale Mountains, Tanzania
Mahale Mountains National Park, Tanzania
Haribahu Shankar Mahale (1930–2005), Indian politician

See also
Bicyclus mahale, a butterfly in Tanzania
Mahal (disambiguation)